Rorschach may refer to:

 Hermann Rorschach, a Swiss psychiatrist
 Rorschach test, his psychological evaluation method involving inkblots
 Rorschach (character), a character from the comics Watchmen
 Rorschach (comic book), a 2020 comic
 Rorschach (band)
 Rorschach (film), a 2022 malayalam film
 Rorschach Test (band)
 The name of an alien vessel from Peter Watt's Blindsight
 Poison Ivy Rorschach, an alternative name for Poison Ivy (musician)
 Rorschach, Switzerland, a municipality, in the District of Rorschach in the canton of St. Gallen

Places 
 Rorschach (Wahlkreis), a constituency of the canton of St. Gallen, Switzerland
 Rorschach, St. Gallen, the largest town in constituency Rorschach, canton of St. Gallen, Switzerland 

Swiss-German surnames